2005 Malta Open is a darts tournament, which took place in Malta in 2005.

Results

References

2005 in darts
2005 in Maltese sport
Darts in Malta